The Ambassador of Australia to the Republic of Korea is an officer of the Australian Department of Foreign Affairs and Trade and the head of the Embassy of the Commonwealth of Australia to the Republic of Korea (South Korea).  The position has the rank and status of an Ambassador Extraordinary and Plenipotentiary and holds non-resident accreditation with the Democratic People's Republic of Korea (North Korea). 

The current ambassador, since February 2021, is Catherine Raper. The Republic of Korea and Australia have enjoyed diplomatic relations since 1961. In June 1962, Australia opened an embassy in Seoul, and after establishing diplomatic relations with North Korea in 1974, Australia opened an embassy in Pyongyang in April 1975. The embassy closed in November 1975 and relations weren't resumed until May 2000, and the embassy in Seoul has been accredited to North Korea since August 2008, the same time accreditation with Mongolia was transferred from the Embassy in Beijing. The Australian Government established an embassy and appointed a resident Ambassador to Mongolia in 2015.

List of heads of mission

See also
Australia–South Korea relations
Foreign relations of Australia

References

External links
Australian Embassy, Republic of Korea

 
 
 
South Korea
Australia